Henry Lai is the name of:

Lai Hang (1928–1965), Chinese actor
Henry Lai Wan-man (born 1961), Hong Kong composer
Henry Lai (scientist), bioengineering scientist and professor at University of Washington